Bloomfield is a township in Essex County, in the U.S. state of New Jersey. As of the 2020 United States census, the township's population was 53,105, an increase of 5,790 (+12.2%) from the 2010 census count of 47,315, which in turn reflected a decline of 368 (-0.8%) from the 47,683 counted in the 2000 census. It surrounds the Bloomfield Green Historic District.

History
The earliest settlers of the area were the Lenape Native Americans. The initial patent for European settlement of the land that would become Bloomfield Township was granted to the English Puritan colonists of Newark, and the area assigned to Essex County in 1675, and Newark Township in 1693. From the 1690s to about the 1720s, much of the northern and eastern land was sold to descendants of New Netherland colonists who had settled Acquackanonk, and the remainder mostly to English families. Speertown (now Upper Montclair), Stone House Plains (now Brookdale), and Second River (now Belleville and Nutley) were essentially Dutch and Jersey Dutch-speaking, while Cranetown, Watsessing, and the Morris Neighborhood (now North Center) were predominantly English. Starting in the mid-18th century, the English and Dutch neighborhoods gradually integrated, with Thomas Cadmus being among the first Dutchmen to settle in an English neighborhood.

Numerous residents served in the Revolutionary War. No significant engagements occurred in Bloomfield, although the locale was on the Continental Army's retreat route after the Battle of Long Island; British and American troops conducted foraging operations; and General George Washington is believed to have visited at least two residences. The Green was set aside to commemorate the use of that space for drilling of militia.

The Presbyterian Society of Bloomfield (now the Bloomfield Presbyterian Church on the Green) was formed in 1794 and named in honor of then-brigadier Joseph Bloomfield, commander of New Jersey troops in the Whiskey Rebellion. About the same time, the Dutch Reformed Church of Stone House Plains (now Brookdale Reformed Church) was established. The two churches became integral institutions of southern and northern Bloomfield, respectively.

Bloomfield was incorporated as a township from portions of Newark Township by an act of the New Jersey Legislature on March 23, 1812. At the time, the Presbyterian parish's namesake was governor of New Jersey and had recently been appointed brigadier general for service in the looming War of 1812.

At the time it was incorporated, the township covered  (almost four times its current area of ) and included several municipalities which were formed from portions of Bloomfield during the course of the nineteenth century, including Belleville (created on April 8, 1839), Montclair (April 15, 1868), Woodside Township (March 24, 1869) and Glen Ridge (February 13, 1895). The Stone House Plains neighborhood was renamed as Brookdale in 1873.

In the township's first century, Brookdale farms thrived while southern Bloomfield industrialized, and the township's infrastructure, civil framework and social institutions developed. Several miles of the Morris Canal passed through Bloomfield. The Oakes woollen mill thrived as a major supplier to the Union Army.

Bloomfield was incorporated as a town on February 26, 1900. In 1904, The city of Newark failed in its attempts to reannex Bloomfield as part of the "Greater Newark" movement. In 1981, the town was one of seven Essex County municipalities to pass a referendum to become a township, joining four municipalities that had already made the change, of what would ultimately be more than a dozen Essex County municipalities to reclassify themselves as townships in order to take advantage of federal revenue sharing policies that allocated townships a greater share of government aid to municipalities on a per capita basis.

In the 20th century, GE, Westinghouse and Schering built major facilities, and among others, the Charms Candy Company was started and grew. After World War I, Brookdale's farms were developed into residential neighborhoods and supporting services. Substantial population growth continued into the 1950s. During World War II, while many Bloomfield men served in the armed forces, Bloomfield's farms and factories, largely staffed by women, supported the war effort. In the decades after the war, the township's industrial base steadily shut down with stricter environmental regulations, rising labor costs, and growing competition. These influences, as well as construction of the Garden State Parkway, further drove urban decay and related population turnover and stagnation through the latter part of the 20th century.

In the early 21st century, redevelopment of blighted and underutilized properties has further shifted Bloomfield towards being a primarily residential municipality.

Geography
According to the United States Census Bureau, the township had a total area of 5.36 square miles (13.88 km2), including 5.34 square miles (13.82 km2) of land and 0.02 square miles (0.06 km2) of water (0.45%).

Silver Lake (2010 total population of 4,243) is an unincorporated community and census-designated place (CDP) defined by the United States Census Bureau as of the 2010 Census that is split between Belleville (with 3,769 of the CDP's residents) and Bloomfield (474 of the total). Brookdale (2010 population of 9,239) is a CDP located entirely within Bloomfield. Watsessing and Ampere North are CDPs in the southern part of the township that were first listed prior to the 2020 census.

Unincorporated communities, localities and place names located partially or completely within the township include Halycon. Bloomfield is in the New York metropolitan area.

The township borders the municipalities of Belleville, East Orange, Glen Ridge, Montclair, Newark and Nutley in Essex County; and Clifton in Passaic County.

Demographics

In 2014, the cost of living in Bloomfield was an average 20% higher than the U.S. average.

According to a 2007 report from CNNMoney.com, the quality of life in Bloomfield in terms of crime are 3 incidents per 1,000 people as compared to the "best places to live average" of 1.3 incidents per 1,000. There were 35 property crime incidents per 1,000 people in Bloomfield as compared to the "best places to live average" of 20.6.

2010 census

The Census Bureau's 2006–2010 American Community Survey showed that (in 2010 inflation-adjusted dollars) median household income was $62,831 (with a margin of error of +/− $2,641) and the median family income was $77,936 (+/− $4,120). Males had a median income of $51,498 (+/− $1,805) versus $44,735 (+/− $2,867) for females. The per capita income for the township was $30,421 (+/− $1,122). About 5.8% of families and 7.4% of the population were below the poverty line, including 7.9% of those under age 18 and 7.9% of those age 65 or over.

2000 census
As of the 2000 United States census there were 47,683 people, 19,017 households, and 12,075 families residing in the township. The population density was 8,961.5 people per square mile (3,460.6/km2). There were 19,508 housing units at an average density of 3,666.3 per square mile (1,415.8/km2). The racial makeup of the township was 70.09% White, 11.69% Black, 0.19% Native American, 8.38% Asian, 0.07% Pacific Islander, 6.42% from other races, and 3.16% from two or more races. Hispanic or Latino of any race were 14.47% of the population.

There were 19,017 households, out of which 28.2% had children under the age of 18 living with them, 46.7% were married couples living together, 12.4% had a female householder with no husband present, and 36.5% were non-families. 30.4% of all households were made up of individuals, and 10.6% had someone living alone who was 65 years of age or older. The average household size was 2.49 and the average family size was 3.16.

In the township, 21.1% of the population was under the age of 18, 8.4% from 18 to 24, 34.0% from 25 to 44, 22.3% from 45 to 64, and 14.3% were 65 years of age or older. The median age was 37 years. For every 100 females, there were 90.8 males. For every 100 females age 18 and over, there were 87.1 males.

The median income for a household in the township was $53,289, and the median income for a family was $64,945. Males had a median income of $43,498 versus $36,104 for females. The per capita income for the township was $26,049. About 4.4% of families and 5.9% of the population were below the poverty line, including 6.3% of those under age 18 and 8.2% of those age 65 or over.

Parks and recreation
Watsessing Park, which is the county's fourth-largest park, covers  split between Bloomfield and East Orange ( in Bloomfield), and features sections of the Second River and Toney's Brook flowing through the park. Both parks are administered by the Essex County Department of Parks, Recreation, and Cultural Affairs.

The Bloomfield Parks and Recreation Department administers eight parks covering .

Government

Local government

Bloomfield operates under a Special Charter granted under an Act of the New Jersey Legislature. The township is one of 11 municipalities (of the 564) statewide that operate under a special charter. The township's governing body is comprised of the Mayor and the six-member Township Council. The mayor and three councilmembers are elected at-large, and one member is elected from each of three wards, with all positions chosen on a partisan basis as part of the November general election. Councilmembers are elected to three-year terms of office on a staggered basis, with the three at-large seats (and the mayoral seat) up for election together and the three ward seats coming up for election two years later and no election in the middle year of the three-year cycle. Bloomfield's charter retains most of the characteristics of the Town form, with additional powers delegated to an administrator.

, the Mayor of Bloomfield is Democrat Michael J. Venezia, whose term of office ends December 31, 2023. Members of the Bloomfield Township Council are Sarah Cruz (D, 2023; Third Ward), Wartyna "Nina" Davis (D, 2022; at-large), Ted Gamble (D, 2022; at-large), Nicholas Joanow (D, 2023; Second Ward), Jenny Mundell (D, 2023; First Ward) and Richard Rockwell (D, 2022; at-large).

In January 2018, the Township Council selected Richard Rockwell from a list of three candidates nominated by the Democratic municipal committee to fill the at-large seat expiring in December 2019 that had been vacated the previous month by Carlos Pomares who resigned from office to serve on the Essex County Board of chosen freeholders. Rockwell served on an interim basis until the November 2018 general election, when he was elected to serve the balance of the term of office.

The Township Council selected Jenny Mundell to fill the vacant First Ward seat expiring in December 2017 that had been held by Elias N. Chalet until he resigned from office after being charged with accepting $15,000 in bribes in exchange for making sure that the township would proceed with the acquisition of a commercial property. After pleading guilty, Chalet was forced to resign from office and could be sentenced to five years in prison.

Emergency services
The township maintains its own police department.

The town is protected by a fire department consisting of 78 active professional firefighters who operate out of four stations, 24 hours a day, 7 days a week.  There is also a squad of volunteers. In 2009, the department received international accreditation. The Fire Prevention Bureau established in 1953 and described as the first of its kind in the state, is operated by the department. It consists of one fire inspector, one fire official and a small support staff of civilians and fire personnel. The department apparatus consist of four engines (one is a rescue pumper), one Truck/Ladder, a rescue and three reserve apparatus. Engine 1 located at the fire headquarters frequently closes due to lack of manpower.

In 2018, the Insurance Services Office once again listed the fire department as a class 2 agency, recognizing it in the top five percent of the nation's fire departments, a ranking it had held for the ten previous years. As of 2020, the department is again working toward achieving accreditation status.

Newark's former Police Director, Samuel DeMaio, is Bloomfield's Public Safety Director who currently oversees both police and fire department operations. The Fire Chief is Louis Venezia. He is the brother of the mayor, Michael Venezia.

Federal, state, and county representation
Bloomfield is in the 11th Congressional district and is part of New Jersey's 28th state legislative district.

Before the redistricting that followed the 2020 census, the township had been split between the 10th and 11th Congressional districts  In the redistricting that went into effect in 2013, 24,480 residents in the northern portion of the township were placed in the 10th District, while 22,835 in the southern section were placed in the 11th District.

Politics
As of March 2011, there were a total of 28,398 registered voters in Bloomfield, of which 11,925 (42.0%) were registered as Democrats, 4,393 (15.5%) were registered as Republicans and 12,061 (42.5%) were registered as Unaffiliated. There were 19 voters registered as either Libertarians or Greens.

In the 2012 presidential election, Democrat Barack Obama received 69.9% of the vote (13,361 cast), ahead of Republican Mitt Romney with 28.8% (5,501 votes), and other candidates with 1.3% (245 votes), among the 19,242 ballots cast by the township's 29,923 registered voters (135 ballots were spoiled), for a turnout of 64.3%. In the 2008 presidential election, Democrat Barack Obama received 62.9% of the vote here (12,735 cast), ahead of Republican John McCain with 35.3% (7,154 votes) and other candidates with 0.9% (186 votes), among the 20,251 ballots cast by the township's 27,981 registered voters, for a turnout of 72.4%. In the 2004 presidential election, Democrat John Kerry received 57.0% of the vote here (10,829 ballots cast), outpolling Republican George W. Bush with 41.5% (7,891 votes) and other candidates with 0.7% (208 votes), among the 19,012 ballots cast by the township's 27,995 registered voters, for a turnout percentage of 67.9.

In the 2013 gubernatorial election, Democrat Barbara Buono received 53.1% of the vote (5,808 cast), ahead of Republican Chris Christie with 45.6% (4,984 votes), and other candidates with 1.3% (141 votes), among the 11,118 ballots cast by the township's 30,606 registered voters (185 ballots were spoiled), for a turnout of 36.3%. In the 2009 gubernatorial election, Democrat Jon Corzine received 53.8% of the vote here (6,241 ballots cast), ahead of Republican Chris Christie with 37.6% (4,359 votes), Independent Chris Daggett with 6.6% (761 votes) and other candidates with 1.3% (147 votes), among the 11,599 ballots cast by the township's 27,929 registered voters, yielding a 41.5% turnout.

Education

Primary and secondary schools

Public schools
The Bloomfield Public Schools serve students in pre-kindergarten through twelfth grade. As of the 2021–22 school year, the district, comprised of 11 schools, had an enrollment of 6,191 students and 538.5 classroom teachers (on an FTE basis), for a student–teacher ratio of 11.5:1. Schools in the district (with 2021–22 enrollment data from the National Center for Education Statistics) are 
Early Childhood Center at Forest Glen (165 students; in grade PreK), 
Berkeley Elementary School (446; K-6), 
Brookdale Elementary School (320; K-6), 
Carteret Elementary School (375; K-6), 
Demarest Elementary School (480; K-6), 
Fairview Elementary School (452; PreK-6), 
Franklin Elementary School (343; K-6), 
Oak View Elementary School (314; PreK-6), 
Watsessing Elementary School (270; K-6), 
Bloomfield Middle School (971; 7-8) and 
Bloomfield High School / Bridges Academy (1,986; 9-12).

As of the 2012–13 school year, the Bloomfield Public Schools had an actual Budgetary Per Pupil Cost of $11,848 (which is 16.4% below the statewide group average was $14,173), while Total Spending Per Pupil for the district was $15,848 (which is 16.0% below the $18,867 statewide).

Bloomfield Tech High School is a regional, countywide magnet public high school that offers occupational and academic instruction for students in Essex County, as part of the Essex County Vocational Technical Schools.

Catholic schools
Saint Thomas the Apostle Parish School, which serves grades K–8, is operated under the supervision of the Roman Catholic Archdiocese of Newark.

Colleges and universities
Bloomfield College, a liberal arts college founded in 1868, is in downtown Bloomfield near the town green. The college has approximately 2,000 students and is affiliated with the Presbyterian Church.

Transportation

Roads and highways

The major New Jersey highway artery that serves Bloomfield is the Garden State Parkway, the longest road in the state. It has four interchanges in the township. Interchanges 148 in the south of Bloomfield and 151 in the north are complete interchanges, while 149 and 150 are partials. The Parkway's Essex toll plaza is southbound just south of interchange 150 in the township. There are two service areas on the Parkway in Bloomfield, one for northbound and one southbound. Troop D of the New Jersey State Police, which patrols the full length of the Garden State Parkway, has a station in Bloomfield at northbound milepost 153.

County Road 506, 506 Spur and 509 also serve Bloomfield.

Commuter rail
South Bloomfield is served by two stations of the NJ Transit Montclair-Boonton Line to Hoboken Terminal or to Penn Station in Midtown Manhattan via the Secaucus Junction. About 55% of the weekday trains terminate in Penn Station via Midtown Direct. On weekends the line terminates in Hoboken. The Bloomfield train station is located off of Bloomfield Avenue in the downtown area.  The Watsessing Avenue station is at the corner of Watsessing Avenue and Orange Street, and is located below ground.

Bloomfield used to be served by other passenger rail lines. The Rowe Street station was served by the Boonton Line until September 2002, when it was closed as part of the addition of Midtown Direct service to the township.  The Walnut Street station, on the same line, was closed in 1953 when the Garden State Parkway was built through it.

Light rail
The Grove Street station on the Newark City Subway line of the Newark Light Rail at the south end of Bloomfield provides service to Newark Penn Station, created as part of an extension to Belleville and Bloomfield that opened in 2002.  This station was part of the Orange Branch of the New York & Greenwood Lake Line of the Erie-Lackawanna Railroad with service to Jersey City which last saw passenger service in 1965. Freight service was discontinued in 2010 by Norfolk Southern with the loss of the last remaining shipper Hartz Mountain.

Buses
NJ Transit bus service is available to and from Newark on the 11, 27, 28, 29, 34, 72, 90, 92, 93 and 94 routes, with local service on the 709 bus line. In October 2009, the Go Bus 28 route was introduced, offering service nearly all day from Bloomfield Train Station to Newark Liberty International Airport.

Airports

Points of interest
 Glendale Cemetery
 Holsten's Brookdale Confectionery, filming location of the final scene in the final episode of The Sopranos.
 The Oakes Estate, constructed in 1895 based on a design by Charles Granville Jones, was added to the National Register of Historic Places in 1981.

Notable events
In 1942, the Westinghouse Lamp Plant in Bloomfield produced the majority of uranium metal used in the Chicago Pile-1, the world's first self-sustaining chain reaction which was a critical early phase of the Manhattan Project to create the first atomic bomb.

On January 29, 2023, at 3 a.m. a person in a ski mask threw a lit Molotov cocktail at Temple Ner Tamid, in an apparent attempt to burn down the synagogue that was unsuccessful, with no damage done to the building. On February 1, a 26-year-old man was arrested and charged with one federal count of "attempted use of fire to damage a building", which could result in 20 years in jail and a fine of up to $250,000 if he is convicted of the crime.

Notable people

People who were born in, residents of, or otherwise closely associated with Bloomfield include:

References

External links

 Bloomfield Township website
 Bloomfield Public Schools
 Brief History of Bloomfield 
 "Bloomfield, NJ: A Starter Spot for Suburbanites", The New York Times, May 24, 2009
 
 

 
1812 establishments in New Jersey
Populated places established in 1812
Special Charters in New Jersey
Townships in Essex County, New Jersey